Loewensberg is a surname. Notable people with the surname include:

 Gret Loewensberg (born 1943), Swiss architect
 Verena Loewensberg (1912–1986), Swiss artist

See also
 Loewenberg (disambiguation)
 Löwenberg
 Löwenburg (disambiguation)